The Pinos Altos Historic District is a historic district which was listed on the National Register of Historic Places in 1984.

It is roughly bounded by Gold Ave. and Cherry, Main, Church, and Silver Streets.

It was a gold camp in the 1800s.  It is located on the Continental Divide, at elevation , in the Pinos Altos Mountains.  The first house there was built in 1860, had a dirt roof, and still survived in 1929.

Two log buildings, both built of square hewn logs, are in the district:
the Pinos Altos School, on Main Street, the first school in Pinos Altos, assertedly built in 1866
the John McDonald cabin, on Spring Street, also probably built in the 1860s.

References

National Register of Historic Places in Grant County, New Mexico
Historic districts on the National Register of Historic Places in New Mexico
Buildings and structures completed in 1860